is a railway station on the Amagi Line  located in Chikuzen, Fukuoka Prefecture, Japan. It is operated by the Amagi Railway, a third sector public-private partnership corporation.

Lines
All Amagi Line trains stop at the station.

Layout
The station consists of a side platform serving a single bi-directional track. There is no station building but an enclosed shelter is provided on the platform for waiting passengers. A ramp leads up to the platform from the access road. A bike shed is provided across the road from the station entrance. Limited parking is available near the station entrance.

Platforms

Adjacent stations

History
Amagi Railway opened the station on 1 November 1987 as an added station on the existing Amagi Line track.

Surrounding area
 National Route 500 - runs parallel to the track in this vicinity.

References

Railway stations in Fukuoka Prefecture
Railway stations in Japan opened in 1987